Bhalchandra Pandharinath Bahirat (5 September 190414 October 1998) was a philosopher and educationist who studied the Marathi literature of Jñāneśvar and other sants of Maharashtra. He was awarded an honorary Doctor of Letters from Pune University in 1991.

Lifework summary
Number of books written by Bhalchandra Pandharinath Bahirat such as The Philosophy of Jnanadeva, Amritanubhava, The philosophy of Jnanadeva as gleaned from the Amrtanubhava and The Philosophy of Jnanadeva are referenced by students, scholars and common people studying saint literature. Apart from Hindu philosophy, he also studied western philosophy and its social and economic impact on communities. His work on The Philosophy of Jnanadeva was presented in 20th World Congress of Philosophy, 1998.

He was affiliated to educational as well as musical institutions and gave lectures in number of colleges, at common gatherings on philosophy and saint culture of Maharashtra. Number of universities appointed him as an examiner for PhD students. He expressed philosophical views as an editor of Marathi magazine Prembodh (Devagarnai:प्रेमबॊध) for eighteen years from 1936 to 1954 which are referenced by international books, such as Who Invented Hinduism: Essays on Religion in History, By David N. Lorenzen. Along with Vinayak Damodar Savarkar, he promoted liberalism of Vithoba Temple, Pandharpur to allow access for common people through conferences and his writings in local news paper Pandhari Sandesh published in 1939. He was the president of Maharashtra State Vishwa Hindu Parishad, Pandharpur Research Society and Saint Wangmay Mandal.

He donated his stature literature on saints, personal library of more than 2500 books to Pune University and The Bhandarkar Oriental Research Institute, Pune. This collection included some of the original manuscripts of the Jñānēśvarī and abhangs by Tukaram.

Early life
After graduating in philosophy from Fergusson College, Pune, he submitted a thesis on The Philosophy of Amritanubhave to Bombay University towards receiving MA degree under guidance of Sonopant V. Dandekar and Gurudev Rambhau Ranade. The University of Pune conferred on him honorary degree of D. Litt. in 1991 along with Pandit Bhimsen Joshi.

He was a member of Varkari culture of Pandharpur, Maharashtra, as a Varkari for Alandi giving religious discourses and Kirtans. His association with Varkari Sampradaya was inspired by Dada Maharaj Satarkar (Bappa). After receiving fellowship from Dada Maharaj Satarkar, he continued this work for 40 years by participating in Pandharpur – Aalandi Vari * (Pressession by walk) Kirtan and Pravachan at various places on Varkari Sampradaya on regular basis.

Dharmarth Maharashtra Sangeet Vidyalaya, Pandharpur
Bhalchandra Pandharinath Bahirat served as treasurer (Devagarnai:कोषाध्यक्ष) of Maharashtra Sangeet Vidyalaya (Devagarnai: महाराष्ट्र संगीत विद्यलय); music school where he was associated with Shanta Apte, Hirabai Barodekar, Mogubai Kurdikar, Panditrao Nagarkar and many other Indian classical music legends of the time. Most of them performed classical music programs at his home due to his appreciation and interest towards classical music. Pandit Jagannath Bua Pandharpurkar, Pandit Dattopant Mangalvedhekar, Baburao Manjul, Pandit Narayanrao Mangalvedhekar, Pandit Shankarappa Mangalvedhekar are some of the people who worked along with Bhalchandra Pandharinath Bahirat to establish Maharashtra Sangeet Vidyalaya as a pioneering music academy.

Birth century celebration
During 4 to 10 Sep 2004, University of Pune arranged birth century celebration of Bhalchandra Pandharinath Bahirat. This included talks towards Varkari Calcture of Pandharpur and saint literature of Maharashtra. Discussion called "Amrutache Antrang" (Devagarnai: अमृताचॆ अंतरंग) was led by Prof. Madhav Pendse, inaugurated by Prof. Dilip Chitre and included contributions from Dr. Sadanand More, Prof. Gauri More and Prof Sonopant Dandekar. The detailed daily updates of related events were published in local news paper Sakal.

Accolades
1991 – Awarded Doctor of Letters (D. Litt.) by Pune University
1991 – Award from Government of Maharashtra for his work during a ceremony at Paithan, Maharashtra
1997 – Sant Dnyaneshwar Puraskar, Dnyaneshwar Sanskritik Pratisthan, Newasa
1998 – Maharashtra Gaurav Puraskar, from Government of Maharashtra at Mumbai
1998 – Honored at Maharashtra Rajya Sahitya ani Sanskruti Mandal, (Devagarnai: महाराष्ट्र राज्य साहित्य आणि संस्कृती मंडळ), Mumbai by prevailing president Dattaram Maruti Mirasdar

Career or posts held
President – Pandharpur Sanshodhan Sanstha, Pandharpur, India
President – Pandharpur Sant Vandmay Mandal, Pandharpur, India
Founder – Dharmartha Maharashtra Sangeet Mahavidyalay
President – Maharashtra State Vishwa Hindu Parishad (Devagarnai: विश्व हिन्दू परिषद)
Evaluator for PhDThesis submitted to Pune, Mumbai, Nagpur and Shivaji Universities
Treasurer – Maharashtra Sangeet Vidyalaya, Pandharpur, India

Books written
Philosophy of Jnanadeva (1954)
The philosophy of Jnanadeva as gleaned from the Amrtanubhava (1998)
The Philosophy of Jnanadeva, 2nd edition (5 February 1998)
Jnanadeva: The Life and Works of Jnanadeva (Saint Heritage of India) (2006)
Varkari Sampraday: Uday va Vikas (1988)

Edited works
Sakal Sant Gatha
Muktshwara's Ovi Ramayan
Rashtra-Bhashya on Amritanubhava by Hariharendra Swami
Jyotsna Tika of Amritanubhava by Shri Bhaiyyakaka Kibe

Marathi writings
Sant Vanicha Amrit Kalash
Bhakticha Kalpvruksha
Nathancha Prasad
Varakari Sampradaya Uday and Vikas
Bhakti Sadhana

Thesis published
Sakalsantagatha (1952)
Mukteshwarkrit Ovi Ramayan: (1952) 3 Editions
Amrutanubhav – Rashtrabhashya (1952)
Santavanicha Amrutkalash (1955)
Bhaktimarg Deepika (1958)

Thesis written
Bhakticha Kalpavruksha (1956)
Nathancha Prasad (1957)
Varkari Sampraday : Udaya ani Vikas (1972), (1988)
Bhakti Sadhana (1981)
Amrutanubhav – Jyotsna Tika (1996)

References

 Amritanubhava 
 Jnanadeva: The Life and Works of Jnanadeva (Saint Heritage of India)
 The philosophy of Jnanadeva as gleaned from the Amrtanubhava 
 The Philosophy of Jnanadeva The Philosophy of Jnanadeva
 Hindupedia 
 Osmania University Library 
 Who Invented Hinduism: Essays on Religion in History 
 Sant Vanicha Amrit Kalash 
 Bhaktisādhanā 
 Vārakarī sampradāya: udaya va vikāsa 
 Vishva Hindu Parishad 
 Supplement on the life of Bhalchandra Pandharinath Bahirat, in the Pandharpur Times; published 5 September 1998
 Article in Daily Sakal, Pune. Dr. B. P. Bahirat birth century program; published 4 September 2004
 International Philosophical Quarterly, Volume 25, Issue: 2
 International Philosophical Quarterly, Volume 26, Issue: 1

External links
Virtual International Authority File 
National Institute of Informatics, Japan 
Tracks Across Time into The 21st Century 
Tracks Across Time into The 21st Century 

20th-century Hindu philosophers and theologians
Savitribai Phule Pune University alumni
Marathi-language writers
People from Solapur district
1904 births
1998 deaths
20th-century Indian philosophers
20th-century Indian educational theorists